Gerves Franklin Fagan (May 12, 1916 – June 18, 1973) was an American Negro league second baseman in the 1940s.

A native of Walls, Mississippi, Fagan made his Negro leagues debut in 1942 with the Jacksonville Red Caps and Memphis Red Sox. He played for Memphis again the following season, and also appeared with the New York Black Yankees, Harrisburg–St. Louis Stars, and Philadelphia Stars Fagan died in Chicago, Illinois in 1973 at age 57.

References

External links
 and Baseball-Reference Black Baseball Stats and Seamheads

1916 births
1973 deaths
Harrisburg Stars players
Jacksonville Red Caps players
Memphis Red Sox players
New York Black Yankees players
Philadelphia Stars players
Baseball second basemen
Baseball players from Mississippi
People from Walls, Mississippi
20th-century African-American sportspeople